Luis Fernando Sinisterra Lucumí (17 June 1999) is a Colombian professional footballer who plays as a winger for Leeds United and the Colombia national team.

Club career

Feyenoord
On 8 July 2018, Sinisterra signed a three-year contract with an option for two more years with Feyenoord for a reported fee of €2 million. He scored his first goal for the club on 8 August 2019, scoring the opening goal in third qualifying round of the 2019–20 UEFA Europa League against FC Dinamo Tbilisi. On 7 February 2020, Sinisterra won the prize for Eredivisie Player of the Month under-21 for the month of January 2020 after scoring in three consecutive matches. On 12 November 2020, Feyenoord announced that the club had used the option in Sinisterra's contract to extend his contract with another two years.

On 19 August 2021, Sinisterra scored a hat-trick in the first leg of their UEFA Europa Conference League play-off round tie against Swedish club IF Elfsborg.

Leeds United
On 7 July 2022 Sinisterra joined Leeds United on a five-year contract for a transfer fee of £21 million. With the move he became the most expensive outgoing transfer in Feyenoord's history. He scored his first goal for the club in a 3-1 win against Barnsley in the EFL Cup second round at Elland Road. He then scored his first Premier League goal a week later, the equaliser in a 1-1 home draw against Everton.

International career
On 15 October 2019, Sinisterra made his debut for the Colombia national football team in a friendly against Algeria, which Colombia lost 3–0. He netted his first international goal on September 24, 2022, scoring Colombia's second in a 4–1 win against Guatemala. On 27 September, Sinisterra scored a brace against Mexico to help his team win 3–2 after trailing 0–2 at half-time.

Career statistics

Club

International

Scores and results list Colombia's goal tally first, score column indicates score after each Sinisterra goal.

Honours
Feyenoord
 UEFA Europa Conference League runner-up: 2021–22

Individual
 Eredivisie Talent of the Month: January 2020
 UEFA Europa Conference League Team of the Season: 2021–22
 UEFA Europa Conference League Young Player of the Season: 2021–22

References

External links
 

1999 births
Living people
Colombian footballers
Colombia international footballers
Sportspeople from Cauca Department
Association football forwards
Categoría Primera A players
Eredivisie players
Once Caldas footballers
Feyenoord players
Premier League players
Leeds United F.C. players
South American Games bronze medalists for Colombia
South American Games medalists in football
Competitors at the 2018 South American Games
Colombian expatriate footballers
Expatriate footballers in the Netherlands
Colombian expatriate sportspeople in the Netherlands
21st-century Colombian people